Ajumma, sometimes spelled ajoomma, is a Korean word for a married, or middle-aged woman. It comes from the Korean word ajumeoni.
Although it is sometimes translated "aunt", it does not actually refer to a close family relationship. It is most often used to refer to middle-aged or older woman since referring to an elder by name without a title in Korea is not socially acceptable.

Ajumma is a less polite term than ajumeoni, which means the same thing but is more respectful. In circumstances where the addressed person is not considerably older than the speaker, or is socially higher than the speaker, it is highly likely that the addressee will be offended when called ajumma. Therefore it is better to use ajumeoni, eomonim (a respectful term for someone else's mother), or samonim.

References

Korean words and phrases
Women in Korea